The Best Thing may refer to:

 "The Best Thing" (Adam Rickitt song), 2000
 "The Best Thing" (Boom Crash Opera song), 1989
 "The Best Thing" (Ivy  song), 1997
 "The Best Thing" (Relient K song), 2007
 "The Best Thing" (Savage Garden song), 2001
 "The Best Thing", a song by Carly Simon from Carly Simon, 1971
 "Best Thing", a song by Styx, 1972
 "Best Thing", a song by Usher from Here I Stand, 2008

See also
 The Best Things (disambiguation)